The Dixie Melody Boys are an American Southern Gospel quartet from  Kinston, North Carolina. They have been active for over 50 years.

History
The group was founded in 1961 by Avis Adkins with Eugene Payne, Ralph Walker Don Henderson and Tony Brown on piano; Ed O'Neal, their bass singer, joined in 1963, and subsequently became the group's leader and manager. Under O'Neal, the group has discovered singers who have gone on to become prominent in Gospel music, including McCray Dove with the Dove Brothers, Rodney Griffin with Greater Vision, Bryan Walker, who went on to become a contestant on Season 9 of American Idol and then later joined the Perrys, and Devin McGlamery with Signature Sound. The group was nicknamed the "Ed O'Neal University" because of the impact that Ed O'Neal has had on the industry  of Gospel music.

The group has had more than twenty hits in the Southern gospel field, including "Antioch Church Choir", "Double Dose", "Don't Point a Finger" and "Jesus In My Boat". The group has released a large number of albums and numerous VHS videos and DVDs. They have also won countless awards and even received a Grammy nomination.

Ed O'Neal has received the Marvin Norcross Award and was inducted into the Southern Gospel Museum and Hall of Fame in 2004.

The current group has re-established themselves as one of Gospel music's top groups. The Dixie Melody Boys released their 50th anniversary project The Call Is Still The Same and held their anniversary reunion celebration at the National Quartet Convention. The group added newcomer, Aaron Dishman, in June 2013 and the quartet veteran, Josh Garner, to their line up in September 2013, marking a new chapter in their history. Tenor, Doug Pittman, joined the group at the National Quartet Convention in Pigeon Forge, Tennessee, in September 2014. Two years later at that same event, the 2016 National Quartet Convention , Ed O’Neal would introduce Willie Sawrey as the groups baritone who would also become instrumental in managing the affairs on the road. Ed O’Neal suffered an accident in April 2019 which led to the added responsibilities for his new baritone.

In January 2013, the Dixie Melody Boys were honored in the Southern Gospel Music Fan awards. 
Favorite Quartet: The Dixie Melody Boys
Favorite Bass: Ed O'Neal

The group also won the Favorite Male Quartet and Favorite Bass Singer awards in 2012. On November 9, 2013 the Dixie Melody Boys were presented with the 2013 AMG Sandy Hosey Lifetime Achievement Award.

Personnel

Current 
 Ed O'Neal – bass (since 1963)
 Buddy Bates–tenor (Since 2020)
 Willie Sawrey – baritone (since 2016)
 Cayden Howell–lead (since 2019)

 Former 

Bass
 Donald Henderson (1961)
 Buddy Hawley (1961-1962)
 Marvin Harris (1962-1963)
 Ed O’Neal (1963-2019, part-time following MVA in 2019)
 Will Lane (2019)
 Earl Roberts (2019-2022)

Baritone
 Gene Payne (1961-1964)
 Delmar Tilghman (1964-1975)
 Henry Daniels (1975-1978)
 Tom Jones (1978-1981)
 Frank Sutton (1981-1983)
 Allen O'Neal (1984–1986)
 David DeLawder (1986–1987)
 Nathan Widenor (1987–1991)
 Bill Bass (1991–1992)
 Rodney Griffin (1992–1993)
 Jamie Bramlett (1994–1995)
 Dave Needham (1995–1997)
 Craig Singletary (1997–1998)
 Kenny Cook (1998)
 Derrick Selph (1998–2003)
 Jeremy Wilkerson (2003)
 Dustin Sweatman (2003–2004)
 Andrew King (2004–2007)
 Bryan Walker (2007)
 Steven Cooper (2007–2013)
 Aaron Dishman (2013–2016)
 Willie Sawrey (2016-present)

Lead
 Avis Adkins (1961-1968)
 John Jarman (1968-1975)
 Dewey Williams (1975-1978)
 David Kimbrel (1978-1982)
 Kent Humphries (1981–1986)
 McCray Dove (1986–1998)
 Jamie Caldwell (1998–2000)
 Devin McGlamery (2000–2004)
 Dustin Sweatman (2004–2006)
 Donald Moris (2006, 2009–2012)
 Bryan Walker (2006–2007)
 Rob Shelton (2007–2008)
 Joe Kitson (2008–2009)
 Mike Rogers (2012–2013)
 Josh Garner (2013-2019)
 Nathan Potts (2019)
 Cayden Howell (2019-2023)

Tenor
 Ralph Walker (1961-1968)
 Charles Forehand (1968-1974)
 Bobby Craft (1974-1975)
 Jimmy Jones (1975-1978)
 Phil Barker (1976-1977, 1978-1983)
 Jamey Ragle (1977–1978)
 Ernie Haase (1983)
 Frank Sutton (1983–1986)
 Gary Coursey (1986)
 David Walker (1986–1987)
 Derrick Boyd (1987-1993, 2019-2020)
 Harold Reed (1993–2004)
 Dan Keeton (2004–2007)
 Jonathan Price (2007–2010)
 Matt Felts (2010–2014)
 Doug Pittman (2014–2017)
 Jerry Skaggs (2017-2019)
 Buddy Bates (2020-present)

Piano
 Tony Brown (1961-1964)
 Everette Harper (1964-1975)
 Greg Simpkins (1975-1978)
 Willie Ollinger (1978)
 Jerry Kelso (1978–1985)
 Bobby Ledford (1986–1988)
 Joe Lane (1988–1989)
 Dwight Young (1989)
 Steve Wood (1989–1992)
 Eric Ollis (1991–2004)
 Dustin Sweatman (2004–2006) (played and sang)
 Aaron Dishman (2013–2016)  (played and sang)

Instrumentalist
 JL Marslender (1974–1975)
 Ron Wells (1977-1983)
 Larry DeLawder (1986–1995)
 Jeff Knight (1985–1986)
 Craig Hamm (lead guitar) 1983–1986
 Allen O’Neal (rhythm guitar) 1975-1986
 George Shambaugh (guitar) 1986
 Randy O’Neal (drummer) 1981-1983
 Ricky Horrell (drummer) 1983
 Olan Witt (drummer) 1983–1985
 Darren Humphrey (drummer) 1986–1988
 Jerry Dunbar (bass guitar) 1968-1973
 Reb Lancaster (bass guitar) 1973-1980
 Frank Sutton (bass guitar) 1980-1986
 Gary Coursey (bass guitar) 1986
 David DeLawder (bass guitar) 1986-1987
 Nathan Widener (bass guitar) 1987-1991
 Bill Bass (bass guitar) 1991-1992
 Rodney Griffin (bass guitar) 1992-1993
 Jamie Bramlett (bass guitar) 1993-1995
 David Needham (bass guitar) 1995-1997
 Craig Singletary (bass guitar) 1997-1998
 Jamie Caldwell (bass guitar) 1998-2000
 Andrew King (bass guitar) 2004-2006
 Steven Cooper (bass guitar) 2013

Discography

Jesus Use Me (1963)
Answering Requests (1964)
Listen (1965)
Favorite Instrumentals of the Dixie Melody Boys (1966)
Together (1973)
Alive (1974)
Unlimited (1974)
Refreshing Soounds (1975)
He Came Back (1975)
Refreshing (1976)
Are You Ready for Gospel (1977)
Sending Up Boards (1978)
Favorite Hymns (1978)
Campmeeting Gospel (1978)
The Sing-Sational (1979)
Sing Happy Gospel (1979)Live! (1980)Just As We Are (1981)And Friends Live 1982
Antioch Church Choir (1982)
More Than Just Good Ole Boys (1983)
Too Much Thunder (1984)
Streetwise (Benson RO3899, 1985)
Run Little Brother (1986)Back Home (1988)Ridin' High (1989)On Fire (1990)Sing The Classics 1990
Dynamic (1991)
Gonna Praise the Lord Live (1992)
No Compromise (1993)
Masterpiece (1994)
Traditions & Harmony (1996)
Old Time Religion (1996)
100% Pure Southern Gospel (1997)
Live in Music City (1998)
Heading Home (1999)
Something Old, Something New (2001)
Quartet Classics (2001)
Request Time (2001)
Vintage (2002)
A Seat in the Heavenly Choir (2004)
Like Never Before (2005)
Live at Pigeon Forge (2005)
Hymns (2006)
Traditions (2006)
Smooth and Easy (2006)
Serenade (2007)
Back to the Good Ole' Days (2007)
Singing the Classics (2009)
Hits Live (2010)
The Call Is Still the Same (2011)
Have You Heard (2013)
Revived (2015)
Worth Every Mile (2021)

In 2004 and 2005, the group released eight compilation albums, entitled Historic Journey vols. 1–8.

Between 2011–2015, several compilations were released:, including Ed O'Neal University: EOU Alumni Vols 1–5, Sights of Heaven, Best of Ed O'Neal, Classic Live Performances,  and Radio Hits.

References

Ivan M. Tribe. Dixie Melody Boys. Encyclopedia of American Gospel Music. Routledge, 2005, p. 102.
Ed O'Neal at the Southern Gospel Music Association
Dixie Melody Boys at sghistory.com

Gospel quartets
Musical groups established in 1961
Musical groups from North Carolina
Southern gospel performers
1961 establishments in North Carolina